Tim Hodge is an American politician and attorney who served as a member of the Kansas House of Representatives from 2017 to 2021.

Education 
Hodge earned a Bachelor of Arts degree from Tabor College in 1999 and a Juris Doctor from Washburn Law School in 2003.

Career 
After earning his undergraduate degree, Hodge worked as a social studies teacher from 1999 to 2001. He previously served on the Newton Board of Education.

In 2016, Hodge challenged Republican Marc Rhoades for the district 72 seat in the Kansas House of Representatives, and won with 51.18% of the vote. When he ran for re-election in 2018, he faced Republican Steven Kelly, and won with 50.49% of the vote. He ran for re-election in 2020, but lost to Republican Avery Anderson.

Electoral record

References 

Living people
People from Newton, Kansas
Tabor College (Kansas) alumni
Washburn University School of Law alumni
21st-century American politicians
Democratic Party members of the Kansas House of Representatives
Year of birth missing (living people)
20th-century births